HD 179949 b is an extrasolar planet discovered by the Anglo-Australian Planet Search at the Anglo-Australian Observatory, which orbits the star HD 179949. The planet is a so-called "hot Jupiter", a Jupiter-mass planet orbiting very close to its parent star. In this case, orbital distance is almost one-tenth that of Mercury from the Sun. One orbital revolution lasts only about 3 days.

Its magnetic field induces a bright spot on its star at 30 degrees latitude, which rotates at 87 degrees inclination. If the planet orbited at 83-97 degrees, then its transit would be visible from Earth. The angle of inclination is therefore 83 degrees or less, but not much less; and its mass is constrained to not much more than 0.923±0.077. The star is not tidally locked to the planet.

Assuming the planet is perfectly grey with no greenhouse or tidal effects, and a Bond albedo of 0.1, the temperature would be 1533 K.  This is, like Tau Boötis b, hotter than the predicted temperature of HD 209458 b (1392K), and close to that of HD 149026 b, before they were measured.

Searches for water in the planet's atmosphere have been inconclusive at first, as have attempts to determine whether titanium and vanadium oxides are present. In the meantime, both carbon monoxide and water have been found in the dayside emission of HD 179949b.

HD 179949 b is a candidate for "near-infrared characterisation.... with the VLTI Spectro-Imager".

The light reflected off planet could not be detected as in 2021, implying HD 179949 b has a low albedo.

The planet HD 179949 b is named Mastika. The name was selected in the NameExoWorlds campaign by Brunei, during the 100th anniversary of the IAU. Mastika is a Malay word, which means a gem, precious stone, jewel or the prettiest, the most beautiful.

References

External links
The Extrasolar Planets Encyclopaedia entry

Hot Jupiters
Sagittarius (constellation)
Exoplanets discovered in 2000
Giant planets
Exoplanets detected by radial velocity
Exoplanets with proper names

es:HD 179949#Sistema planetario
ru:HD 179949#HD 179949 b